And Chaos Died (1970) is a science fiction novel by American writer Joanna Russ, perhaps the genre's best-known feminist author. Its setting is a dystopian projection of modern society, in which Earth's population has continued to grow, with the effects somewhat mitigated by advanced technology. The novel was nominated for, but did not win, the 1970 Nebula Award.

Plot introduction

On the grossly-overpopulated planet, remnants of "nature" exist only in the isolated areas not covered by housing, industry and industrial farming. Creativity and individuality are suppressed and channeled into rigid social formats. A powerful bureaucracy/police state oversees the acts of all citizens. Its purpose is to maintain control for the planetary elite, and to that end it is prepared to resort to any method, however ruthless.

In contrast to all this, the author introduces another planet on which human development has followed a diametrically opposite path: the natural world is respected; population is limited; and each individual is encouraged to develop uniquely. On this other world, human beings are known to be basically "spiritual", and immortal in nature. Telepathy and telekinesis are developed as much and as rapidly as possible.

As the narrative progresses, a confrontation develops between these different systems.

Reception
James Blish praised the novel, saying "The totality is impressive not only for its inventiveness and the brilliance of its technique, but because the fantastic central assumption has been used to tell you real things about the real human psyche." Modern readers have been less welcoming, though: Lee Mandelo, writing for Tor.com, called And Chaos Died "a strange, psychedelic book that, in many ways, doesn’t age well," citing in particular the apparent curing of the main character's homosexuality as a problematic element.

References

Sources
 Samuel R. Delany, The Order of "Chaos" (review), in Science Fiction Studies 6, 3 (November 1979).

External links 
 
 And Chaos Died at Fantastic Fiction

1970 American novels
Dystopian novels
Feminist science fiction novels
1970 science fiction novels
Overpopulation fiction
Books with cover art by Leo and Diane Dillon
Ace Books books
Works by Joanna Russ